Croydon and Sutton is a constituency represented in the London Assembly.

It consists of the combined area of the London Borough of Croydon and the London Borough of Sutton.

Overlapping constituencies
The south of Croydon is traditionally a more Conservative area, while the north of Croydon has traditionally Labour-voting areas. Sutton is competitive between the Liberal Democrats and the Conservatives. The equivalent Westminster seats are:

Carshalton and Wallington (Conservative)
Croydon Central (Labour)
Croydon North (Labour)
Croydon South (Conservative)
Sutton and Cheam (Conservative)

Assembly Members

Mayoral election results 
Below are the results for the candidate which received the highest share of the popular vote in the constituency at each mayoral election.

Assembly election results

Notes

References

London Assembly constituencies
Politics of the London Borough of Croydon
Politics of the London Borough of Sutton
2000 establishments in England
Constituencies established in 2000